In molecular biology, Vibrio cholerae ToxT activated RNAs are small RNAs which are produced by the bacterium Vibrio cholerae. They are regulated by the transcriptional activator ToxT and may play a role in V. cholerae virulence. Two ToxT activated RNAs have been described: TarA (ToxT activated RNA A) and TarB (ToxT activated RNA B).

TarA
The TarA small RNA regulates PtsG, a glucose transporter involved in the regulation of glucose uptake. Regulation of PtsG by TarA may be dependent upon the Hfq protein, an RNA chaperone.

TarB
TarB inhibits the expression of Toxin coregulated pilus biosynthesis protein F (TcpF). It does not act in conjunction with Hfq.

See also
Vibrio regulatory RNA of OmpA
Qrr RNA

References

RNA
Non-coding RNA